The Meaning of Marxism is a 2006 nonfiction book written by Columbia University professor and managing editor of The International Socialist Review Paul D'Amato and published by Haymarket Books in 2006.

Synopsis 
Dr. D'Amato presents a brief introduction to the philosophy of Karl Marx and Frederich Engels through a Trotskyist perspective.

Reception 
The book received reviews from journals including International Socialist Review, Critical Sociology, and Midwest Book Review.

References 

2006 non-fiction books
Marxist books
Haymarket Books books